Still the King: Celebrating the Music of Bob Wills and His Texas Playboys is a tribute album by American country group Asleep at the Wheel in memory of Bob Wills and the Texas Playboys. It was released in March 2015 under Proper Records.

Track listing

Commercial performance
The album debuted on the Top Country Albums chart at No. 14 and No. 187 on the Billboard 200, selling 3,900 for the week in the US. It rose to No. 11 on the Top Country Albums chart in its third week, selling 8,600 in three weeks.  The album has sold 24,600 copies in the US as of August 2015.

Charts

References

2015 compilation albums
Asleep at the Wheel albums
Proper Records compilation albums
Bob Wills tribute albums